Adolph V, Count of Holstein-Segeberg ( – 1308) was the ruling count of Holstein-Kiel from 1263 to 1273 and of Holstein-Segeberg from 1273 until his death.

Life
He was the elder of the two sons of Count John I of Holstein-Kiel and Elizabeth of Saxe-Wittenberg.

In 1273, the county was divided between Adolph V and his younger brother John II on the one hand, and their uncle Gerhard I on the other hand.  Gerhard I received Holstein-Itzehoe; Adolph V and John II then divided their share between themselves, with Adolph V receiving the river Elbe and Great Lake Plön and extensive estates along the Lower Elbe north-west of Hamburg.  Adolph V then styled himself "Count of Holstein and Stormarn". He resided at Siegesburg Castle in Segeberg, which was the largest castle in the county.  His part of the county is called Holstein-Segeberg by historians.

Adolph V died in 1308.  Since he had no male heir, Holstein-Segeberg fell to his nephew Adolph VII, the son of John II.  However, Adolph VII was killed in a private revenge in 1315.  Holstein-Segeberg then fell to John II.  When John II died in 1316, Holstein-Segeberg was divided between the two remaining Count of Holstein: Gerhard III of Holstein-Rendsburg and Adolph VII of Holstein-Pinneberg and Schaumburg.

Marriage and issue
Adolph V was married to Euphemia (d. after 1316), a daughter of Duke Bogislaw IV of Pomerania-Wolgast.  They had one daughter:
Elisabeth (d. 1318), married in 1307 to Burchard I, Count of Lindow-Ruppin.

External links
genealogie-mittelalter.de 

House of Schauenburg
Counts of Holstein
1252 births
1308 deaths
13th-century German nobility
Place of birth unknown
Place of death unknown